The 2016 Military Bowl was a postseason college football bowl game, played at Navy–Marine Corps Memorial Stadium in Annapolis, Maryland, on December 27, 2016.
The ninth edition of the Military Bowl featured the American Athletic Conference champion Temple Owls versus the Wake Forest Demon Deacons of Atlantic Coast Conference.

Teams 
The game featured the Temple Owls against the Wake Forest Demon Deacons.

This was the second all-time meeting between the schools; the previous one was on November 1, 1930, when the Owls defeated the Demon Deacons by a score of 36–0.

Temple

Wake Forest

Game summary

Scoring summary

Statistics

References 

2016–17 NCAA football bowl games
2016
2016 Military Bowl
2016 Military Bowl
2016 in sports in Maryland
December 2016 sports events in the United States